Ascandra ascandroides is a species of calcareous sponge from Brazil.

References

Animals described in 1971
Fauna of Brazil
ascandroides